Grigory Potemkin (1739–1791) was a Russian military leader, statesman, nobleman and favourite of Catherine the Great's.

Potemkin may also refer to:

Fictional entities
 Potemkin (Guilty Gear), a character in the Guilty Gear series of fighting games
 Potemkin, a character in Celebration (1969), a musical by Tom Jones
 Potemkin, a fictional Soviet submarine in "To Kill the Potemkin"
 USS Potemkin, a fictional starship in the Star Trek episode "The Ultimate Computer"

Other uses
 Russian battleship Potemkin
 Potemkin (surname) 
 Potemkin (architecture), a steel park in Japan

See also
 Battleship Potemkin uprising, a mutiny in 1905
 The Battleship Potemkin, a film by Sergei Eisenstein dealing with the mutiny
 Potemkin village, a term for fake settlements
 Potemkin Island, an island in southern Ukraine named after Grigory Potemkin
 "Potemkine", a song by Jean Ferrat glorifying the uprising